New York's 12th State Assembly district is one of the 150 districts in the New York State Assembly. It has been represented by Republican Keith Brown since 2021.

Geography
District 12 is in Suffolk County. It encompasses portions of the towns of Babylon, Huntington, and Islip.

Recent election results

2022

2020

2018

2016

2014

2012

References 

12
Suffolk County, New York